The Westland F.7/30 (or Westland PV.4) was a British fighter prototype. A single prototype was built in 1934, but the type was not put in production because its performance fell far below the RAF's requirements. The Gloster Gladiator won the F.7/30 competition.

Development

The Westland F.7/30 was designed in response to Air Ministry Specification F.7/30, which was formally issued in October 1931 and subsequently amended many times. It called for a day and night fighter with an armament of four .303-in (7.7-mm) machine guns, a top speed of at least , a high rate of climb, and a low landing speed. Although the specification did not request the use of the Rolls-Royce Goshawk evaporatively-cooled engine, the Air Ministry informally expressed a strong preference for its use and all of the design proposals selected by them for building as prototypes used it. The specification stressed the importance of a good "fighting view" from the cockpit and suggested a low-wing monoplane design as one possible solution to this problem. Another idea suggested was a pusher configuration

The designer of the Westland F.7/30, Arthur Davenport, initially opted for a monoplane with the engine buried in the fuselage over the wing centre section, driving a tractor propeller through a long extension shaft. This put the pilot in front of and slightly above the engine, so that he also had an excellent forward view. Concerns about a possibly high landing speed resulted in the conversion of the design to a biplane with a gull wing configuration for the upper wing.

In this form the F.7/30 was completed in 1934. It was an elegant, if unconventional biplane. The gulled upper wing and the straight lower wing were connected by N struts and braced by wires. The landing gear was fixed, with main wheels covered by spats. From his high position the pilot had an excellent view forwards, upwards and to the sides, as the cockpit was ahead of the wing leading edge. Initially the cockpit was open, but in two stages this was converted into a fully enclosed cockpit. The machine guns were installed in the cockpit's side walls, two on each side.

The initial tail configuration was unusual, the rudder hinge line being vertical when the aircraft was on the ground rather than when in flight. It was hoped that this would improve its effectiveness on the ground, but after testing the aircraft received a larger tailfin of more conventional design.

The engine was a Rolls-Royce Goshawk III or IIS, cooled by a radiator that was installed ventrally, aft of the legs of the fixed undercarriage. The position of the engine put the exhausts between the wings, behind and below the cockpit.

It also needed 18.8 minutes to reach , and in view of these disappointing performance figures the type was abandoned.

Specifications

See also

References

1930s British fighter aircraft
F.7 30
Cancelled military aircraft projects of the United Kingdom
Single-engined tractor aircraft
Biplanes
Gull-wing aircraft
Aircraft first flown in 1934